Andrew Christensen is a distinguished research professor at University of California, Los Angeles, specializing in clinical psychology. He is also a published author of 10 books, and is held in 3,151 libraries worldwide, the highest held book being in 804 libraries.

References

Year of birth missing (living people)
Living people
University of California, Los Angeles faculty
21st-century American psychologists
American male writers